The 1820 United States presidential election in Massachusetts took place between November 6 and December 1, 1820, as part of the 1820 United States presidential election. Voters chose 15 representatives, or electors to the Electoral College, who voted for President and Vice President.

During this election, the Democratic-Republican Party was the only major national party, but the Federalist Party (which had no candidate) won the popular vote in Massachusetts. The unpledged Federalist electors won Massachusetts by a wide margin of 36.00%.

Results

See also
 United States presidential elections in Massachusetts

References

Massachusetts
1820
1820 Massachusetts elections